Cream ale is a style of American beer which is light in color and well attenuated, meaning drier and with a somewhat higher alcohol content than regular beer. First crafted in the mid-1800s at various breweries in the United States, cream ale remained a very localized form with different styles until the early 20th century. During Prohibition in the United States, a great number of Canadian brewers took up brewing cream ale, refining it to some degree. Following the end of Prohibition, cream ale from Canada became popular in the United States and the style was produced anew in both nations.

Style 
Cream ale is related to pale lager. They are generally brewed to be light and refreshing with a straw to pale golden color. Hop and malt flavor is usually subdued but like all beer styles it is open to individual interpretation, so some breweries give them a more assertive character. Despite the name, cream ales do not contain any dairy products.

While cream ales are top-fermented ales, they typically undergo an extended period of cold-conditioning or lagering after primary fermentation is complete. This reduces fruity esters and gives the beer a cleaner flavor. Some examples also have a lager yeast added for the cold-conditioning stage or are mixtures of ales and lagers. Adjuncts such as corn and rice are used to lighten the body and flavor, although all-malt examples are available from many craft brewers.

Examples 
 A Frame Cream Ale (A Frame Brewing, Squamish, BC)
 All or Nothing Think Big'Ger Cream Ale (All or Nothing Brewhouse, Oshawa, Ontario)
 Castle Cream Ale (Castle Danger Brewing Company, Two Harbors, Minnesota)
 Coastie Cream Ale (St. Michael's Brewing Company, Navarre, Florida)
 Creole Cream Ale (Abita Brewing Company, Abita Springs, Louisiana)
 Croydon Cream Ale (Neshaminy Creek Brewing Company)
Genesee Cream Ale (Genesee Brewing Company, Rochester, New York)
 Hale's Cream Ale (Hale's Ales)
 Katie's Cream Ale (Great Basin Brewing Company)
 Muskoka Cream Ale (Muskoka Cottage Brewery)
 Newburgh Cream Ale (Newburgh Brewing Company)
 Schoenling Little Kings (Schoenling Brewing Company)
 Session Cream Ale (Full Sail Brewing Company)
 Sleeman Cream Ale (Sleeman Breweries)
 Sunlight Cream Ale (Sun King Brewing)
 Unicorn Milk (Twenty Six Acres Brewing, Concord, North Carolina)
 Scoop Dog (Wise Man Brewing, Winston-Salem, North Carolina)
 Post Road Detour (Lost Shoe Brewing & Roasting Company, Marlborough, Massachusetts)
 Retro Styles Pre-Prohibition Cream Ale (Analog Brewing Company, Edmonton, Alberta)
 Kiwanda Pre-Prohibition Cream Ale (Pelican Brewery, Pacific City, Oregon)

See also 

 Beer style
 Draught beer
 Kolsch
Irish cream ale {c.f. Kilkenny (beer)}

References 

American beer styles
Canadian alcoholic drinks